The 2007 NSW Premier League season was the seventh season of the revamped NSW Premier League.

The 2007 regular season began on 24 February 2007, at 16:00 UTC+10, and concluded on 5 August 2007 with the Grand Final where Blacktown City Demons FC defeated Bankstown City Lions FC 3–1.

During the course of the season, all Premier League, Super League and Division teams were involved in the TigerTurf Cup, an equivalent to the English FA Cup with teams competing in a series of elimination games.

Changes from previous season
The only format change for this competition was that the first week of the finals would be played over two legs instead of one. The regular season remained a home-away format.

Clubs
Teams promoted from Super League:
(After the end of the 2006 season.)
 Penrith Nepean United

Teams relegated to Super League:
(After the end of the 2006 season.)
 Parramatta Eagles

Regular season

League table

Results

Finals series
After the home and away season, the finals series began with the top four teams competing for the champions trophy. The finals series used a modified Page playoff system, with the difference that each first-round game would be played over two legs.  The winner of the finals series, Blacktown City Demons FC was crowned as the NSW Premier League champions and as the holder of the top position on the league ladder were also named premiers.

Standard cup rules – such as the away goals rule (two-leg ties only), extra time and penalty shootouts were used to decide drawn games.

Statistics

Top goalscorers

See also
NSW Premier League
Football NSW

References

External links
NSW Premier League Official Website

2007
2007 domestic association football leagues